Somavaram  is a village in Krishna district of the Indian state of Andhra Pradesh. It is located in Nandigama mandal of Vijayawada revenue division. It is one of the villages in the mandal to be a part of Andhra Pradesh Capital Region.

References 

Villages in Krishna district
Villages in Andhra Pradesh Capital Region